Maelgwn ap Rhys (died 1295, birth unknown) was a rebel and descendant of Maelgwn ap Rhys ap Gruffydd. HIs father was Rhys Fychan, Geneu'r Glyn's last lord. On 29 September 1294, Madog ap Llywelyn led a national revolt against King Edward's royal administration in north and west Wales. While Madog rebelled in the North, Maelgwn ap Rhys led the revolt in Ceredigion. Maelgwn attempted a siege of Llanbadarn but was unsuccessful. His campaign also involved heavy raids in Pembroke and Carmarthen, until the earl of Gloucester's men killed Maelgwn in 1295 in a fight near Carmarthen. Maelgwn had two brothers, Rhys and Gruffydd, both of whom were imprisoned in Norwich until as late as 1308.

References 
 J. E. Morris, The Welsh Wars of Edward I a contribution to mediaeval military history, based on original documents, Oxford, 1901
 Bridgeman, History of the Princes of South Wales, 1876
 https://biography.wales/article/s-MAEL-APR-1295

1295 deaths